Lobelia leucotos is a small herbaceous plant in the family Campanulaceae native to Western Australia.

The perennial herb blooms between January and June producing white flowers.

The species is found in the Kimberley region of Western Australia where it grows in skeletal sandy soils.

References

leucotos
Flora of Western Australia
Plants described in 2000